Hilda Astrid Abrahamz Navarro (born November 14, 1962) is a Venezuelan telenovela actress and former beauty pageant titleholder. She was the official representative of her country in the 1980 Miss World pageant held in London, United Kingdom on November 13, 1980, where she was one of the top 15 semifinalists.

Telenovelas

Cine

References

External links
Telemundo Website
Official "Victoria" Website
Miss Venezuela Official Website
Miss World Official Website

1959 births
Living people
Actresses from Caracas
Miss World 1980 delegates
Miss Venezuela World winners
Venezuelan telenovela actresses